Wettstein is a Swiss surname. Bearers of the name include:

Carla Wettstein (born 1946), Swiss and Australian chess master
Fritz von Wettstein (1895–1945), Austrian botanist
Johann Jakob Wettstein (1693–1754), Swiss theologian
Johann Rudolf Wettstein (1594–1666), Swiss diplomat
Otto von Wettstein (also given as Otto Wettstein-Westersheimb) (1892–1967), Austrian zoologist
Richard Wettstein (1863–1931), Austrian botanist

See also
Wettstein system, system of plant taxonomy developed by Richard Wettstein